Turşsu (known as Kilsəli until 1991) is a village in the municipality of Çay Rəsullu in the Gadabay Rayon of Azerbaijan.

References

Populated places in Gadabay District